Mohammad Ali Safia (born February 12, 1997) is an Iranian footballer who plays as a winger for Iranian club Kheybar Khorramabad in the Azadegan League.

Club career

Club Career Statistics
Last Update: 11 November 2021

References

Living people
1997 births
Association football wingers
Iranian footballers
Esteghlal F.C. players
Naft Masjed Soleyman F.C. players
Havadar S.C. players
Sanat Mes Kerman F.C. players
Sportspeople from Khuzestan province